Richard Maxwell Huffman (March 27, 1923 – September 13, 1992) was an American gridiron football tackle in the National Football League (NFL) and the Canadian Western Interprovincial Football Union (WIFU). 

A 9th round selection (81st overall pick) of the 1945 NFL Draft, Huffman played four seasons for the Los Angeles Rams (1947–1950). He then went to the WIFU (a precursor to the CFL's Western Conference) where he played for seven seasons for the Winnipeg Blue Bombers (1951–1955) and the Calgary Stampeders (1956–1957). 

While still playing pro football, he began a career as a professional wrestler in the offseason.

In 1987, he was inducted into the Canadian Football Hall of Fame.

References

External links 
 

1923 births
1992 deaths
All-American college football players
Sportspeople from Charleston, West Virginia
Players of American football from West Virginia
American football offensive tackles
American football defensive tackles
American players of Canadian football
Tennessee Volunteers football players
Los Angeles Rams players
Western Conference Pro Bowl players
Canadian football defensive linemen
Canadian football offensive linemen
Winnipeg Blue Bombers players
Calgary Stampeders players
Canadian Football Hall of Fame inductees
Stampede Wrestling alumni
American male professional wrestlers
Professional wrestlers from West Virginia